Noble Consort Zhang (張貴妃, personal name unknown, 1024–1054), posthumously Empress Wencheng (溫成皇后), was an imperial concubine of Emperor Renzong of Song. She was the emperor's favorite concubine, but did not become an empress (at least during her life) due to the strong opposition of the emperor's "mother" Empress Dowager Liu. Consort Zhang, a native of Yong'an, Henan (now south of Gong County, Henan), was an important figure in the Kunning Palace Incident of Emperor Renzong and the birth mother of Princess Anshou, Princess Baohe, and Princess Tang.

Childhood
Lady Zhang was the daughter of Zhang Yaofeng (張堯封) and Lady Cao (曹氏) and she had two younger sisters. Zhang Yaofeng was a scholar and died early, and Lady Cao wanted to take her daughter to Zhang Yaofeng's brother, Zhang Yaozuo (张尧佐). Zhang Yaozuo stated that the distance for the mother and daughter to travel was too far and refused. Lady Cao eventually became a dancer for the then . She noticed that Lady Zhang was beautiful, and took her into the palace at the age of 8 along with her sisters. Lady Zhang was raised by Lady Jia (賈氏), a palace attendant.

Consort
As the clouds disperse and the romantic years move, Jun's kindness has not diminished in the past.

It's not because you hide your face and leave behind your love, you are unforgettable and graceful.

— Elegy by Ouyang Xiu, a writer in the Northern Song Dynasty, for the Empress WenchengLady Zhang was clever and intelligent, good at welcoming, and she was powerful both at home and abroad. She was renowned for her beauty, and she attracted the attention of Emperor Renzong at a banquet. Lady Zhang was favored by Renzong because of her outstanding appearance, graceful dancing posture, and attentiveness to the emperor. Lady Zhang was his favorite out of all the consorts in the harem. She gave birth to his first daughter Princess Anshou (安壽公主, 1040–1042) and was given the rank of Cairen. Princess Anshou was the Emperor's favorite daughter until her death. Lady Zhang was promoted to the rank of Xiuyuan (修媛). Lady Zhang gave birth to her second daughter Princess Baohe (寶和公主, 1042–1043), but she soon died too. As a result, Lady Zhang was demoted to the title of Meiren. She gave birth to her third daughter Princess Tangguo (唐國公主, 1044–1045), but her last child also died in infancy.

Consort Zhang's mother Lady Cao was styled Lady of Qinghe (清河郡夫人) by Emperor Renzong. Her uncle Zhang Yaozuo was appointed as an official at the Southern Court of Xianhui. Zhang Yaozuo was constantly promoted, and went from being a 7th rank to a 6th rank official. This led to the opposition of several officials, such as Bao Zheng. That same year, Consort Zhang received the honorable title of Guifei, one rank from the Empress. She was known to love eating kumquat, and this sparked competition in markets.

Noble Consort Zhang passed away at the age of 31, around the new year. Emperor Renzong grieved her for seven days and composed poems for her. He dressed her in the robes of an Empress, which caused the opposition of many officials since Empress Cao was alive. On the fourth day of the funeral, Renzong gave her the posthumous posthumous title of Empress Wen Cheng (Virtue and gentleness are called Wen, Qi Sheng Guangyuan is called Cheng). Noble Consort Zhang who wanted to become Empress all her life, finally wore the queen's funeral clothes after her death. Emperor Renzong bestowed her mother the title of Lady Qi (齐国夫人) and Zhang Yaozuo the senior advisor.

Titles
Princess of Qinghe (清河郡君)
Cairen (才人)
Xiuyuan (修媛)
Meiren (美人)
Guifei (贵妃)
Empress Wencheng (温成皇后)

Media
Noble Consort Zhang is played by Xiao Han in the 2017 Chinese web series Oh My General. 
Noble Consort Zhang is played by Wang Churan in the 2020 Chinese television series Serenade of Peaceful Joy. The series chronicles the life of Emperor Renzong, his consorts, and his daughters.

References 

1024 births
1054 deaths
Song dynasty imperial consorts
Chinese concubines
Song dynasty posthumous empresses